Nemacheilus chrysolaimos is a species of ray-finned fish in the genus Nemacheilus.

Footnotes 

 

C
Freshwater fish of Indonesia
Fish described in 1846